Synaptocochlea pulchella is a species of sea snail, a marine gastropod mollusk in the family Trochidae, the top snails.

Description
The size of the shell attains 2.5 mm. The oval shell is convexly depressed. Its color is white, spotted with red. The back of the shell is convex and all over striated. The spire is rather prominent,. The whorls are rounded. The oval aperture is large. It is pearly and iridescent within.

Distribution
This marine species occurs in the West Pacific.

References

External links
 To GenBank (4 nucleotides; 1 proteins)
 To World Register of Marine Species
 

pulchella
Gastropods described in 1850